Trigonorhinus tomentosus is a species of fungus weevil in the beetle family Anthribidae. It is found in Central America and North America.

Subspecies
These two subspecies belong to the species Trigonorhinus tomentosus:
 Trigonorhinus tomentosus andersoni Valentine
 Trigonorhinus tomentosus tomentosus (Say, 1826)

References

Further reading

 
 

Anthribidae
Articles created by Qbugbot
Beetles described in 1827